Between Raising Hell and Amazing Grace is the third studio album by American country music duo Big & Rich. It was released on June 5, 2007, by Warner Bros. Nashville. The album's lead-off single "Lost In This Moment," became the duo's first Number One single on the Hot Country Songs chart. Also released from this album were the title track and "Loud", which respectively peaked at No. 37 and No. 42 on the same chart. The latter was the first single of the duo's career not to reach Top 40.

Between Raising Hell and Amazing Grace debuted at number six on the U.S. Billboard 200 and at number one on the Billboard Top Country Albums chart, selling about 103,000 copies in its first week. As of August 25, 2007, the album has sold 325,577 copies in the US.  A deluxe edition containing the album along with a live DVD of the Rhapsody Originals performance was offered as well as a Walmart exclusive edition which included a DVD of the duo's soundcheck session.  A deluxe digital version was also offered.

The track "You Shook Me All Night Long" is a cover of the song of the same name by the Australian rock band AC/DC. "Lost in This Moment" was covered on Keith Anderson's second album, C'mon!.

Track listing

Personnel

Big and Rich
 Big Kenny – vocals, string composer (6), string arrangements (6)
 John Rich – vocals, acoustic guitar (2,3,7,9,11), cymbal swells (4), percussion (4)

Additional Musicians
 Max Abrams – saxophone (14)
 Roy Agee – trombone (14)
 Larry Babb – tambourine (3)
 Steve Brewster – drums (3,4,6,10,12,13,14)
 Mike Brignardello – bass guitar (3,6)
 Pat Buchanan – electric guitar (11)
 Tom Bukovac – electric guitar (2,4,9,13,14)
 Gary Burnette – acoustic guitar (6), electric guitar (6)
 J.T. Corenflos – electric guitar (3,10,12)
 Eric Darken – percussion (7)
 Paul Franklin – steel guitar (3)
 Tommy Harden – drums (2,9), drum loop (2)
 Wes Hightower – background vocals (2,3,6,10,13)
 Wyclef Jean – vocals (12)
 Mike Johnson – steel guitar (2,6,11,14)
 Wayne Killius – drums (11)
 Marc Lacuesta – background vocals (6)
 Howard Laravea – keyboards (11)
 John Legend – vocals (5)
 Steve Patrick – trumpet (14)
 James Pennebaker – electric guitar (13)
 Matt Pierson – bass guitar (11)
 Ethan Pilzer – bass guitar (2,4,9,10,12,13,14)
 Mike Rojas – Hammond organ (2,3,10,12,14), piano (2,6,7,9,12,13), synthesizer (2,4,6)
 Adam Shoenfeld – acoustic guitar (12), electric guitar (2,3,4,6,7,9,10,11,12,13,14), solo (6)
 Kenneth "Scat" Springs – background vocals (6)
 Jonathan Yudkin – banjo (12), cello (2), fiddle (3,4,9,11,12,13,14), harp (7), mandolin (2,10,11), string composer (4,6,7), string arrangements (4,6,7), strings (4,6,7), violectra (3), viosynth (11)

Chart performance

Weekly charts

Year-end charts

Singles

Certifications

References

2007 albums
Big & Rich albums
Warner Records albums
Albums produced by John Rich
Albums produced by Paul Worley